Amila Weththasinghe (born 3 January 1982) is a Sri Lankan former cricketer. He played in 71 first-class and 55 List A matches between 2002/03 and 2013/14. Outside of Sri Lanka, Weththasinghe also played league cricket in Lincolnshire and Cumbria in England, and Grade cricket in Australia.

References

External links
 

1982 births
Living people
Sri Lankan cricketers
Colombo Cricket Club cricketers
Kandurata cricketers
Moors Sports Club cricketers
Sri Lanka Police Sports Club cricketers
Place of birth missing (living people)